Sherman Robertson (October 27, 1948 – January 28, 2021) was an American blues guitarist and singer who has been described as "one part zydeco, one part swamp blues, one part electric blues and one part classic rhythm and blues."

Biography 
Robertson was born in Breaux Bridge, Louisiana, and raised in Houston, Texas. At the age of 13, he watched a performance on television by Hank Williams. Duly inspired and equipped with a cheap guitar purchased by his father, he started playing the songs previously performed by Freddie King and Floyd London. As he lived close to the Duke/Peacock recording studio, Robertson took the opportunity to acquaint himself with some of the musicians who recorded there. At the same time, in his late teens, Robertson played in a band in various bars of his Fifth Ward, Houston neighborhood.

In 1982, Clifton Chenier heard Robertson's band playing at the Crosstown Blues Festival. Robertson moved back to Louisiana, learned to play slide guitar, and toured for several years in the 1980s with Chenier. Robertson contributed to his Live At The (1982) and San Francisco Blues Festival (1985) albums. After Chenier's death, Robertson played with Rockin' Dopsie, appearing on his Crowned Prince Of Zydeco album (1986), and Terrance Simien & the Mallet Playboys, before going solo.

In addition, Robertson's guitar work appeared on Paul Simon's Graceland album, and he was on the bill at the 1994 Notodden Blues Festival.

Robertson's I'm the Man (1994) was the first release on the Code Blue label. It was nominated for a W.C. Handy Award. Robertson's follow-up, Here & Now (1995), included his cover of the Tracy Nelson song "Here & Now". However the record label folded and Robertson re-appeared in 1998 on the independent label, Audioquest, with his next offering, Going Back Home. In November 2005 he released Guitar Man – Live with his new backing band, BluesMove.

In 2008, Robertson and BluesMove played at the Harvest Time Blues festival in Monaghan, Ireland. In 2011, Robertson and BluesMove appeared at the Rhythm Festival in Bedfordshire, England.

In 2012, a proposed concert in Gaildorf, Germany, was canceled after Robertson suffered a stroke. He died in 2021, aged 72.

Discography 
I'm the Man (1994) – Atlantic/Code Blue Records
Here & Now (1996) – Atlantic/Code Blue Records
Going Back Home (1998) – Sledgehammer Blues (formerly AudioQuest Music)
Guitar Man – Live (2005) – Movin Records

References

External links 
Official website
Photograph and videos at NME.com
Magazine articles at Movinmusic.co.uk

1948 births
2021 deaths
American blues guitarists
American male guitarists
American blues singers
American male singers
Songwriters from Louisiana
Electric blues musicians
Singers from Louisiana
Musicians from Houston
Slide guitarists
People from Breaux Bridge, Louisiana
Blues musicians from Louisiana
Songwriters from Texas
Guitarists from Louisiana
Guitarists from Texas
20th-century American guitarists
20th-century American male musicians
American male songwriters